Silver Lake USD 372 is a public unified school district headquartered in Silver Lake, Kansas, United States.  The district includes the communities of Silver Lake, Kiro, and nearby rural areas.

History
In 1911, a new six room brick school building replaced the original two room structure and the first high school class was organized.

In 1928, that building became the elementary school.

In 1952, the high school burned and a new high school was completed in 1953.

In 1961, a new elementary school was completed in 1961.

In 1994, a sizeable addition was made to the existing high school, including a new gym, locker room facilities, and classrooms.  The middle school grades 7 and 8 were moved to the same building as the high school.  The elementary/middle school building which was previously grades 3-8 became grades 1–6.  And the old elementary building (the original high school building from 1911), which had been K through grade 2, became preschool and Kindergarten only. 

In 2008, a new gym was built at the elementary school.  It is three times the size of the original gym.

In 2010, USD 372 suffered major spending cuts, which included the art program, teachers, lunches, etc.

District
The superintendent for USD 372 is Brad Womack.

High school
The principal of the high school is Ryan Luke.

State Championships
Silver Lake High School only hangs a single banner for each sport with its list of state titles. The eight banners hanging in the high school gymnasium list the 70 Academic and Athletic State titles won in team competition.

Academics
Silver Lake High School has claimed 18 Academic team titles.

Debate:
 The high school debate team won the Kansas State 3-2-1A 4-Speaker Tournament in 1996, 2013, 2014, and 2018. They also won the Kansas State 3-2-1A 2-Speaker Tournament in 1996, 1997, 2004, 2007, and 2013. Former coach Gail Naylor lead the school to seven of those championships, and current coach Michelle Taylor is responsible for the recent 4-speaker victories in 2014 and 2018.

Speech:
 Silver Lake had a remarkably successful speech team throughout the 1990s and 2000s, with championship teams in 1994, 1998, and 1999. The speech team dominated 3A competition in Kansas when they won four consecutive state championships in 2001, 2002, 2003, and 2004, marking the second most championships in a row that a Silver Lake program has had.

Athletics
Silver Lake High School has claimed a total of 52 Kansas State Athletic Championships.

Football:
 The Silver Lake Eagles football team has made 18 appearances at the Kansas State 3A Football Championship including wins in 1981, 1984, 1989, 1991, 1997, 2006, 2010, and 2013.

Basketball:
 The only time the boys' basketball won the state championship was in 1981.  However, the Lady Eagles have won multiple championships including in 1983, 1984, 1988, 2002, 2012 and 2016.

Volleyball:
 Silver Lake's Lady Eagles have won seven state championships in volleyball (1998, 2003, 2004, 2006, 2007, 2013, 2014, 2016, and 2018).

Baseball:
 The first state championship ever won by the Silver Lake Eagles was for baseball in 1953. Coincidentally, the Eagles won the championship the next year in 1954, marking the first back-to-back state championships for Silver Lake.  Silver Lake subsequently won the 3A State Baseball Championships thirteen more times in 1970, 1974, 1977, 1978, 1980, 1982, 1996, 1997, 1998, 2005, 2008, 2009, and 2011.

Softball:
 12 state Championships have been won by the Lady Eagles Softball team since 1992 (including a 5-peat from 1992-1996, the longest stretch of repeat champions by a Silver Lake program):  1992, 1993, 1994, 1995, 1996, 1999, 2004, 2005, 2009, 2013, 2014, 2015, and 2018.

Elementary school
The principal of the elementary school is Ronda Pegram.

The elementary school team has also received titles for youth competitions and other events.

See also
 Kansas State Department of Education
 Kansas State High School Activities Association
 List of high schools in Kansas
 List of unified school districts in Kansas

References

External links
 

School districts in Kansas
Education in Shawnee County, Kansas
1911 establishments in Kansas